Octane is an alkane with the chemical formula C8H18. 

Octane may also refer to:

Chemistry
 2,2,4-Trimethylpentane or iso-Octane
 Octane rating, a motor-fuel classification

Art and entertainment
Octane (album), a 2005 album by Spock's Beard
Octane (film), a 2003 film by Marcus Adams
Octane (magazine), a British car magazine
Octane (Sirius XM), a Sirius XM Radio hard rock channel
Octane, a character in the video game Apex Legends

Computing
Octane (software test), a performance benchmark of Javascript engines used in web browsers
Octane Render, a 3D rendering application
SGI Octane, an SGI computer

See also
 Octan, fictional oil company that has appeared in numerous Lego construction sets